The Duchess and the Dirtwater Fox is a 1976 American Western romantic comedy film starring Goldie Hawn and George Segal, produced, directed and co-written by Melvin Frank. It is about an 1880s dance hall girl (Hawn) from San Francisco who steals a satchel of ill-gotten money as part of her plan to change her identity into an English governess and get a job with a wealthy family in Utah. She then has to elude the former owners of the money, the Bloodworth Gang, on a cross-country chase.

Plot
In 1882 San Francisco, popular dance hall girl Amanda Quaid learns that Mormon millionaire Josiah Widdicombe is seeking a well-bred governess for his children. Looking for an easier life, Amanda needs $65 to buy clothes for the interview. She accepts an invitation from gambler Charlie "Dirtwater Fox" Malloy to join him in his hotel room, where she discovers he is carrying a satchel full of stolen money that he acquired by double-crossing the Bloodworth gang in a bank robbery. Drugging Charlie and stealing the satchel, she buys a new outfit and successfully interviews with Widdicombe as the "Duchess of Swansbury."

When Charlie finds the money gone, he heads east on his horse Blackjack and catches up to the stagecoach carrying Amanda to Salt Lake City, Utah. Charlie recognizes Amanda and makes her agree to give him a portion of her salary in exchange for keeping her real identity a secret. On their trip, they encounter snakes, rapids, horseback pursuits through towns, a Jewish wedding, and the Bloodworth gang who capture them and take back the money. The pair are tied down with stakes and left to die, but manage to escape when Amanda uses a pair of lorgnette spectacles to burn through the ropes.

The couple almost make it to Salt Lake City, but Charlie is not willing to give up the money and hatches a plan to get it back from the Bloodworth gang. He sets booby traps at the gang's ranch and starts a fire in the barn, retrieving the loot in the process. In the ensuing chase and gunfight, the gang members are killed but Charlie is wounded. Charlie believes he is dying, but Amanda calls him lazy, grabs the satchel and walks toward Salt Lake City; Charlie and Blackjack get to their feet and follow.

Cast
 George Segal as Charlie "Dirtwater Fox" Malloy
 Goldie Hawn as Amanda "Duchess" Quaid
 Conrad Janis as Gladstone
 Thayer David as Josiah Widdicombe
 Jennifer Lee as Trollop
 Sid Gould as Rabbi
 Pat Ast as Music hall singer
 E. J. André as Prospector
 Dick Farnsworth as Stagecoach driver
 Clifford Turknett as Mr. Weatherly
 Roy Jenson as Bloodworth
 Bob Hoy as Ingersoll, Bloodworth gang member
 Bennie Dobbins as Murphy, Bloodworth gang member
 Walter Scott as Graves, Bloodworth gang member
 Jerry Gatlin as Stein, Bloodworth gang member

Production
The film was shot in and around the historic community of Central City, Colorado as well as in Westcliffe and various locations in Fremont County.  Matte paintings were used to re-create the historic look of San Francisco and Salt Lake City. Purportedly, the scene of the location where the stagecoach crashed off the stage road onto the cliff below was along Shelf Road (which connects Canon City to Cripple Creek, and follows Fourmile Creek) as it wanders through Helena Canyon.

Reception
Richard Eder of The New York Times wrote that "the gags make for monotony. Here the action—there is lots of it—has been polluted for the sake of gags that are rarely even funny in themselves." The Chicago Tribune'''s Gene Siskel gave the film two stars out of four and noted it was indebted to the comedy of Mel Brooks and Blazing Saddles in particular, but only had one really funny scene (in which Segal and Hawn converse in a mixture of different languages). Arthur D. Murphy of Variety wrote, "While the 104-minute film is more than simply an acceptable effort, it lacks the punch, dash and excitement which makes a film comedy really great." Charles Champlin of the Los Angeles Times called it "a vigorous little diversion, fast, efficient and peppered if not replete with inventive jokes ... Mostly the movie has Segal and Hawn, who are both shrewd and attractive light comedians." Caroline Lewis of The Monthly Film Bulletin'' wrote that "except when they are scoring points off the more obvious clichés, the visual and verbal puns seem rather unsure of their targets, and the film fails to sustain the pace set by a few hilarious scenes."

The film has a 33% rating on Rotten Tomatoes based on 6 reviews.

References

External links
  
 
 
 Behind-the-scenes production photos Collection of crew member Stephen Lodge.

1976 films
1970s American films
1970s Western (genre) comedy films
1976 romantic comedy films
20th Century Fox films
American Western (genre) comedy films
American romantic comedy films
1970s English-language films
Fictional couples
Films directed by Melvin Frank
Films scored by Charles Fox
Films set in 1882
Mormonism in fiction